Rough and Tough and Dangerous – The Singles 94/98 is the first singles compilation from the German electronic/hardcore group Scooter, released in January 1998. It collects all the singles from their first four albums, plus one new song, a cover of Zyon's "No Fate". It includes some live tracks, B-sides and remixes. The title is a lyric from the Maxi Version of the single "Endless Summer".

Track listing 

Note: Track 12 on CD2 is an edited version.

Charts

References

External links
 Scooter Official Site
 Discogs.com Album Information
 Scooter Biographical Timeline

Scooter (band) albums
1998 compilation albums